Samuel Everett Pingree (August 2, 1832June 1, 1922) was a lawyer, a U.S. politician of the Republican Party, and an American Civil War veteran who received the Medal of Honor.

Early life
Pingree was born in Salisbury, New Hampshire, the son of Stephen and Judith (True) Pingree. He received his early education in Andover, New Hampshire, and McIndoes Falls, Vermont, then entered Dartmouth College, where he graduated in 1857. He studied law in Bethel, Vermont, and was admitted to the bar in Windsor County in December 1859. He began practicing law in Hartford in partnership with his brother Stephen (1835-1892).

Civil War

He enlisted in Company F, 3rd Vermont Infantry, and was soon chosen first lieutenant. In August 1861, he was promoted to captain, and was commissioned major on September 27, 1862, and lieutenant colonel on January 15, 1863. He was severely wounded at the Battle at Lee's Mills on April 16, 1862, during which he led his company across a wide creek and drove the enemy from rifle pits on the opposite bank. He spent ten weeks recuperating in a Philadelphia hospital.

During the second day of the Battle of the Wilderness, Pingree was placed in command of the 2nd Vermont Infantry, since all the field officers of that unit had been killed or wounded. Pingree participated in the battles of Spotsylvania, North Anna, Cold Harbor, Petersburg, and Weldon Railroad, where he narrowly escaped capture with a portion of his command. Pingree's final military action occurred at Fort Stevens on July 11, and July 12, 1864. He mustered out of the service on July 27, 1864. On August 17, 1891, Pingree received the Medal of Honor for his 1862 actions at Lee's Mills.

While Samuel Pingree served with the 2nd and 3rd Vermont, his brother Stephen Morse Pingree (1835-1892) was a member of the 4th Vermont Infantry; originally a first lieutenant in Company E, he eventually attained the rank of colonel as the regiment's commander.

After leaving the Army, Samuel and Stephen Pingree led the 8th Infantry Regiment of the Vermont Militia; Samuel commanded as a colonel, and Stephen was second-in-command as a lieutenant colonel.

Postwar life
Pingree returned to Hartford and his law practice, and received his Master of Arts degree from Dartmouth in 1867. In 1868 and 1869, he was state's attorney for Windsor County. He served as town clerk of Hartford for 50 years, and in 1868 was chosen delegate-at-large to the Republican National Convention at Chicago. In 1870 he was elected president of the Vermont Officers' Reunion Society.

In the fall of 1882, Colonel Pingree was elected lieutenant governor, and in 1884, governor. "His administration was characterized by the same efficiency and zeal which he has ever displayed as soldier, lawyer and citizen."

After his tenure as governor, Pingree served as chairman of the board of the newly established state railway commission from 1886 to 1894.

He was a trustee of Vermont Academy in Saxtons River from 1885 to 1910. He also served as judge advocate of the Medal of Honor Legion, an organization established in 1890 to protect the reputation of the medal.

In 1898 he was awarded the honorary degree of LL.D. from Norwich University.

Family
On September 15, 1869, Pingree married Lydia M. Steele, daughter of Sanford and Mary (Hinman) Steele, of Stanstead, Quebec.  Lydia Steele was the sister of Benjamin H. Steele, who was a college classmate of Pingree's, and served as an Associate Justice of the Vermont Supreme Court.

Lydia Steele and Samuel Pingree were the parents of an adopted son, William Steele Pingree (1879-1965).  William S. Pingree attended Norwich University for three years, and Boston University Law School for one.  He completed his legal studies with his father, and after being admitted to the bar in 1904, the younger Pingree practiced law in Hartford, Vermont, served as town clerk (1923-1942), and also served as Windsor County State's Attorney.

Medal of Honor citation

Rank and Organization:
Captain, Company F, 3d Vermont Infantry Place and date: Lees Mills, Va., April 16, 1862. Entered service at. Hartford, Vt. Birth: Salisbury, N.H. Date of issue: August 17, 1891.

Citation:
Gallantly led his company across a wide, deep creek, drove the enemy from the rifle pits, which were within 2 yards of the farther bank, and remained at the head of his men until a second time severely wounded.

See also

List of Medal of Honor recipients
List of American Civil War Medal of Honor recipients: M–P
Vermont in the Civil War

Notes

References
Benedict, G. G., Vermont in the Civil War. A History of the part taken by the Vermont Soldiers And Sailors in the War For The Union, 1861-5, Burlington, VT: The Free Press Association, 1888, pp. i:114–116, 138–144, 148–149, 254–259, 376, 443, 462, 476, 491; ii:357–361, 364.
Carleton, Hiram, Genealogical and Family History of the State of Vermont, New York: The Lewis Publishing Company, 1903, i:16–18.
Dodge, Prentiss C., Encyclopedia Vermont Biography, Burlington, VT: Ullery Publishing Company, 1912, p. 47.
Peck, Theodore S., compiler, Revised Roster of Vermont Volunteers and lists of Vermonters Who Served in the Army and Navy of the United States During the War of the Rebellion, 1861–66. Montpelier, VT.: Press of the Watchman Publishing Co., 1892, pp. 67, 70, 89, 741.
Ullery, Jacob G., compiler, Men of Vermont: An Illustrated Biographical History of Vermonters and Sons of Vermont,'' Brattleboro, VT: Transcript Publishing Company, 1894, part 2, p. 315.

External links

1832 births
1922 deaths
People from Salisbury, New Hampshire
Republican Party governors of Vermont
Lieutenant Governors of Vermont
United States Army Medal of Honor recipients
People of Vermont in the American Civil War
Vermont Brigade
Union Army soldiers
People from Hartford, Vermont
Vermont lawyers
State's attorneys in Vermont
Norwich University alumni
American Civil War recipients of the Medal of Honor
Burials in Vermont
19th-century American lawyers